Lavey may refer to:

Places
 Lavey, County Cavan, a civil parish of Ireland
 Lavey, County Londonderry, a parish in Northern Ireland
 Lavey, Switzerland, a former municipality in Switzerland 
 Lavey-les-Bains, a village in the district of Aigle in the canton of Vaud, Switzerland
 Lavey-Morcles, a municipality in the district of Aigle in the canton of Vaud, Switzerland
 Lavey-Village, a village in the district of Aigle in the canton of Vaud, Switzerland

Other uses

 Anton LaVey, an American occultist
 Lavey GAC, a Gaelic Athletic Association club based in Lavey, County Londonderry